The 2009 Vietnamese National Cup (known as the Bamboo Airways National Cup for sponsorship reasons) season is the 17th edition of the Vietnamese Cup, the football knockout competition of Vietnam organized by the Vietnam Football Federation.

Five teams (Viettel Football Club (The Cong, in season), Becamex Binh Duong FC, Nam Dinh Football Club, Khanh Hoa FC and Ha Noi ACB F.C.) will not compete in the first round, and are automatically qualified for the round of 16.

First round

Round of 16

Quarter–final round

Semi-finals

Final

Finalist players

Viettel FC (The Cong) Squad
As of 29 August 2009

SHB Da Nang FC Squad
As of 29 August 2009

References

Vietnamese National Cup
Vietnam
Cup